Waverbridge is a hamlet in the civil parish of Dundraw, right on the boundary with the civil parish of Waverton in Cumbria, United Kingdom. It is located approximately two-and-three-quarter miles north-west of Wigton, three-and-three-quarter miles south-east of Abbeytown, and seven-and-a-half miles north-east of Aspatria. Carlisle, Cumbria's county town, is situated fourteen-and-a-quarter miles to the north-east. The B5302 road runs through the settlement, between Silloth-on-Solway in the west and Wigton in the east.

The hamlet is named for its bridge over the River Waver. Historically there was a mill in Waverbridge, as well as a school, both are now used for residential purposes.

References

Hamlets in Cumbria
Allerdale